The 1946 Stanley Cup Finals was a best-of-seven series between the Boston Bruins and the Montreal Canadiens. The Canadiens would win the series four games to one.

Paths to the Finals
Boston defeated the Detroit Red Wings 4–1 to advance to the Finals. Montreal defeated the Chicago Black Hawks 4–0 to advance to the Finals.

Game summaries
Brothers Terry and Ken Reardon faced each other in the 1946 Stanley Cup Finals, with Terry playing for Boston and Ken playing for Montreal. This made them one of the few sets of brothers to face each other on opposing teams in the Stanley Cup Finals, and the two even dropped gloves against each other at one point.

Stanley Cup engraving
The 1946 Stanley Cup was presented to Canadiens captain Toe Blake by NHL President Red Dutton following the Canadiens 6–3 win over the Bruins in game five.

The following Canadiens players and staff had their names engraved on the Stanley Cup

1945–46 Montreal Canadiens

See also
 1945–46 NHL season

References and notes

 Podnieks, Andrew; Hockey Hall of Fame (2004). Lord Stanley's Cup. Bolton, Ont.: Fenn Pub. pp 12, 50. 

Stanley Cup
Stanley Cup Finals
Boston Bruins games
Montreal Canadiens games
Ice hockey competitions in Boston
Ice hockey competitions in Montreal
1940s in Boston
Stanley Cup Finals
Stanley Cup Finals
1940s in Montreal
Stanley Cup Finals
Stanley Cup Finals
Stanley Cup Finals
Stanley Cup Finals